The 1971 Green Bay Packers season was their 53rd season overall and their 51st season in the National Football League (NFL). The team finished with a 4–8–2 record under first-year coach Dan Devine, earning them a fourth-place finish in the NFC Central division. This would be Hall of Fame quarterback Bart Starr's last season as an active player.

Offseason

NFL draft

Personnel

Staff

Roster

Schedule

Monday (November 1, 22)
Note: Intra-division opponents are in bold text.

Game summaries

Week 8

Week 13

Ray Nitschke Day

Standings

References

External links
 1971 Green Bay Packers at Pro-Football-Reference.com

Green Bay Packers seasons
Green Bay Packers
Green